Scymnus luctuosus, is a species of beetle found in the family Coccinellidae discovered by Thomas Lincoln Casey Jr. It is found in North America.

References 

Coccinellidae
Beetles described in 1899
Taxa named by Thomas Lincoln Casey Jr.